The electoral district of Eildon is an electoral district of the Victorian Legislative Assembly in Australia. It was created in the redistribution of electoral boundaries in 2013, and came into effect at the 2014 state election.

It is a new district created due to the abolition of the districts of Seymour and Benalla, taking in area to the south of these districts toward the outer northeastern suburbs of Melbourne. It includes the towns of Eildon, Healesville, Kinglake, Marysville, Mansfield, Warburton, Powelltown, and other towns in the Mansfield, Murrindindi, Yarra Ranges and Nillumbik local government areas.

The abolished seat of Seymour was held by Liberal MP Cindy McLeish, who retained the new seat at the 2014 election.

Members

Election results

Graphical summary

References

External links
 District profile from the Victorian Electoral Commission

Eildon, Electoral district of
2014 establishments in Australia
Shire of Murrindindi
Shire of Nillumbik
Shire of Mansfield
Yarra Ranges